The 85-mm antitank gun D-48 was a Soviet 85-mm calibre anti-tank gun used after World War II. It was designed as the replacement for the 100 mm field gun M1944 (BS-3). Distinguishing features of the D-48 include a very long barrel and a pepper-pot muzzle brake. The D-48 was itself replaced in the 1960s by the T-12 antitank gun.

Overview
The gun was designed by the F. F. Petrov Design Bureau on the basis of the D-44 85-mm divisional gun and production of the D-48 began in 1953 at the No. 75 factory in Yurga. The D-48 used the breechblock from the BS-3 100-mm field gun in order to achieve a rate of fire of 15 rounds per minute at maximum cadence. The gun can transition from march to combat order in about two minutes.

The D-48N was a version with an APN 2-77 or 3-77 infrared imaging device fitted for night combat.  A licensed version of the D-48 was produced in China as the Type 60.

The gun fires a high velocity armor-piercing-capped-ballistic-cap tracer (APCBC-T) BR-372 Projectile at 1040 meters per second and can penetrate 185mm of armor at a range of 1000 meters at an angle of obliquity of 90 degrees. The 3BK-7 high explosive antitank (HEAT) projectile can penetrate 192mm of armor at an angle of obliquity of 60 degrees. The effective range of armor-piercing shells for the D-48 is 1,230 meters (HVAP-T) or 940 meters (HEAT). Additionally, the D-48 antitank gun is capable of firing a 9.66 kilogram OF-372 high explosive projectile to a direct fire range of 1,200 meters or an indirect fire range of 18.97 kilometers. The Ammunition for the D-48 was developed by necking down 100-mm ammunition in order to achieve higher muzzle velocities.

The gun is towed by a URAL-375D truck or an AT-P tractor with a maximum towing speed over asphalt roadway of about 60 km/h.  The tires on the D-48 are those of the ZIS-5 truck.

Designs with auxiliary power units were also investigated but never developed beyond prototype stage.

Use by other nations
The D-48 has been exported to Afghanistan, Bulgaria, Congo, India, Iraq, North Korea, Mongolia, Mozambique, Romania, Somalia, Sudan, and Vietnam.

Citations

References
 Brassey's Encyclopedia of Land Forces and Warfare, Brassey's Inc., Washington D.C., 2000, .
 Die Landstreitkräfte der NVA, Wilfried Kopenhagen, Motorbuch Verlag, Stuttart, 2003, .
 Jane's Armour and Artillery 1981-1982, Jane's Publishing Company Ltd, London, 1982.
 Shunkov V. N. - The Weapons of the Red Army, Mn. Harvest, 1999 (Шунков В. Н. - Оружие Красной Армии. — Мн.: Харвест, 1999.) .

External links

 Page in Russian on the D-48.

85 mm artillery
Anti-tank guns of the Cold War
Anti-tank guns of the Soviet Union
Military equipment introduced in the 1950s